Notable people with given name Harris include:

 Harris Allan (born 1985), Canadian actor and recording artist
 Harris Andrews (born 1996), Australian footballer with the Brisbane Lions
 Harris Armstrong (1899-1973), American modernist architect
 Harris Barron (1926-2017), American artist
 Harris Barton (born 1964), American football player
 Harris Blake (1929–2014), American politician
 Harris Boyle (1953–1975), Irish soldier
 Harris Downey (1907–1979), American writer
 Harris Faulkner (born 1965), American newscaster and television host
 Harris Hines (1943-2018), American judge
 Harris A. Houghton (1874-1946), American physician and military intelligence officer
 Harris Hull (1909–1993), American USAF general
 Harris Jayaraj (born 1975), Indian film score composer
 Harris Johns, German record producer
 Harris Leuke Ratwatte (1900-1964), Sri Lankan Sinhala legislator and Dissawa
 Harris Mowbray (born 1999), Braille-related linguist
 Harris Weinstock (1854-1922), American businessman
 Harris Wittels (1984–2015), American comedian and actor
 Harris Wofford (1926-2019), American attorney and politician
 Harris (rapper) (born 1976), German rapper

Fictional characters 

 Harris (Porridge), a character from the UK sitcom Porridge

Given names
Masculine given names
Arabic masculine given names
English masculine given names
Indonesian masculine given names